Anthony Sharp (1643–1707) was a Dublin Quaker and wool merchant.

Early life
Anthony Sharp, the son of Thomas Sharp, was born in Tetbury, Gloucestershire, England in January 1643.

Religion and business
In 1665, impressed by the ministry of William Dewsbury at a meeting in Warwick prison, he joined the Religious Society of Friends, also known as the Quakers.  In the summer or early fall of 1669, due to persecution of his Quaker religious beliefs, he fled from Gloucestershire and moved to Dublin and engaged in the woolen trade, in which he was highly successful.  By 1680, he employed about 500 workers in the trade and in 1688, the weavers’ guild elected him master.

Anthony Sharp was active in the Dublin Quaker Community. In 1683, he and some other Friends of Dublin were thrown into prison because they continued to attend their religious meetings, contrary to the orders of government which prohibited the public meetings of religious dissenters.

Land rights
Anthony Sharp was one of the original shareholders of West New Jersey in 1677.  Subsequently, when William Penn purchased land in East Jersey, Sharp also became an owner of property there as well.  Not wishing to emigrate himself due to his successful woolen business, Sharp remained in Dublin.  Anthony Sharp financed the Quaker colony established in New Jersey in 1681.

Among those appointed to found the colony was Anthony's nephew, Thomas Sharp, with whom he corresponded on both business and personal matters.

In his will, Anthony Sharp bequeathed to his eldest son, Isaac Sharp, his land in West New Jersey, and half of his lands in East New Jersey, as well as his land in Queen's County, Ireland, including land in Killinure, which became the site of the Sharp Roundwood Estate.

Death and family
Anthony Sharp died on 13 January 1707, and was buried in the ancient Friends' burying-ground adjacent to St. Stephen's Green in the city of Dublin. He was survived by three sons, Isaac, Joseph and Daniel, and one daughter, Rachel Sharp. Anthony Sharp's father (born about 1603 in Tetbury, Gloucester, England) married Anthony's mother, Elizabeth Hookham on 27 Nov 1628 in Gloucester. Elizabeth Hookham was born about 1607 in Gloucester. They had 7 children William, Elizabeth, Elizabeth, Anthony, Isaac, Anis, and Thomas.

Biography published
Stanford University Press published a biography of Anthony Sharp by Richard L. Greaves titled, Dublin's Merchant-Quaker: Anthony Sharp and the Community of Friends, 1643–1707.

Notes

Bibliography

Clement, John (1877). Sketches of the first emigrant settlers in Newton Township, Old Gloucester County, West New Jersey. Camden: Sinnickson Chew

 West Jersey Proprietors (1964). Burlington, New Jersey: Revell Press

External links
Roundwood House
Brief History of the Roundwood House

1707 deaths
1643 births
Businesspeople from County Dublin
Converts to Quakerism
Irish Quakers
17th-century Irish people
17th-century Quakers
18th-century Quakers